Josette Frank (March 27, 1893 – September 9, 1989) was an American children's literature expert and educational consultant. Frank spent most of her adult life working for the Child Study Association of America (CSAA), a leading authority on child development from the 1920s to the 1960s. Frank was engaged as the CSAA's child reading expert and published a parental literary guide titled What Books For Children? in 1937 with a new edition in 1941. Due to her progressive views about parental supervision of children's reading, Frank became one of the significant pro-comics voices during the American anti-comics movement of the 1950s, for which she received praise and criticism.

Early life 
Frank was born on March 27, 1893, in Manhattan, New York City into a family of secular Jews. Her father, Leo, owned a successful furniture business. As a young girl, she was involved in early feminism and the Women's Land Army. She got her first job when she was 19, working as a secretary for Theodore Roosevelt. She also investigated child labor and worked with poor immigrants in New York's Lower East Side while living in Greenwich Village.

Child Study Association of America

Early years 

Frank first became involved with the Federation For Child Study, group that became the CSAA, in 1923. Frank served as an assistant editor for their magazine, Child Study. Her first prominent advocacy for child-guided reading came in 1936, in an issue of Parents Magazine: "We can best guide our children's reading if we let our children's reading guide us instead of trying to mold them into preconceived patterns of 'what the well-read child should read,' let us rather encourage them to find their way to real experiences of their own in the vast world of books."

Reflecting her increasing familiarity with children's literature, CSAA director Sidonie Matsner Gruenberg suggested Frank publish a book recommending children's literature to parents. Frank's book, What Books For Children?, came out first in 1937, and Frank promoted the book at the New York Times National Book Fair, held at Rockefeller Center in November of that year. The fair brought Frank's progressive ideas about oversight of children's reading to a much larger audience, and Frank reassured parents that their children's morals were not shaped to a great amount by reading material. The article was one of the first times Frank also discussed children's readership of comic books, saying:

In a response to a letter critical of Frank's liberalized views on children's reading, Frank noted that children could never be wholly protected from forbidden literature by parental oversight alone, saying "...we know that prohibiting has ever had the effect of enhancing the allure of the forbidden."

Comics advocacy 
After Chicago Daily News writer Sterling North condemned comic books as "graphic insanity" and "sex-horror serials" in one of his columns, comic book companies rushed to save their image and prove that they were not as harmful as North made them out to be. National Comics Publications managing editor Whitney Ellsworth sent out a memo to his staff that read:

In 1941, she joined National's editorial advisory board in a part-time position. Her name, along with the rest of the board, was published in every National comic book starting in mid-1941. Members were paid regardless of their input, and they were usually sent sample story outlines to review rather than finished comic books. In 1943, she sent a letter criticizing sexual and bondage imagery in Wonder Woman stories to National's publisher, Max Gaines.

In the new chapter on comic books published in Frank's 1941 2nd edition of What Books For Children?, Frank became more candid about her comic book advocacy, posing a question towards understanding children's interest in comics. She reveals one of the main aspects of parental frustration with comic books: "the intensity of the children's absorption in these paper-covered concentrations of color and motion leaves us aghast." Much of the chapter focuses on explaining the appeal of comics to a decidedly parental audience. Frank reasons that children have always craved adventure, but questions on a deeper level why children ostensibly nurtured and protected from danger craved stories (presumably) filled with "bloodcurdling horror, mystery, violence, and sudden death".

In the end, Frank reasoned that

After the publication of What Books For Children?, the CSAA featured two articles by Frank in their Spring 1942 and Summer 1943 issues of Child Study, the organization's magazine. Frank's first article was largely a rehashing of the book's chapter, while the second demarcated and analyzed different types of comic books.

By 1950, reading comics books was widely considered to be harmful to children. Hilde Mosse, the acting physician in charge of the Lafargue Clinic, used Frank's position on the advisory board to discredit her pro-comic writings published in the Journal of Educational Sociology at a 1950 symposium on comics held at a New York school. In 1954, the Senate held hearings to investigate a link between comic books and juvenile delinquency. During the proceedings, Estes Kefauver grilled Child Study Association of America president Gunnar Dybwad over Frank's links to the comic book industry, suggesting as Mosse did earlier that her writing was not credible due to her professional affiliations (receiving pay from the industry). Personal life and death 
Frank married Henry Jacobs in 1923 but kept her maiden name, which was a rare decision at the time. Frank refused to open mail addressed to her using her husband's name, and would return unopened letters saying that no person with that name lived there. Her husband died in 1941. They had two children, a daughter named Judith and a son named Stephen. In addition to her work with the CSAA, she also served on committees for the National Conference of Christians and Jews and the National Committee for Program Services of the Campfire Girls.

Frank died of pneumonia on September 9, 1989, in a nursing home in Alexandria, Virginia.

 Legacy 
As part of the CSAA, Frank was the first editor of the Children's Book Committee at the Bank Street College of Education and had helped choose the recipient of the annual Children's Book Award for children's fiction since its inception in 1944. In 1997, the award was renamed in her honor.

 In popular culture 
Connie Britton portrayed Frank in the 2017 film Professor Marston and the Wonder Women, where she is depicted as a comics-critical moralist leading a National Comics Publications hearing against the sexual content of William Moulton Marston's Wonder Woman comics. The conservative image of Frank in the film was heavily criticized by her granddaughter, Yereth Rosen: "Real Josette was pretty much the opposite of a Focus-on-the-Family-type arch-conservative Christian, for reasons beyond the fact that she was not a Christian."

See alsoProfessor Marston and the Wonder WomenBibliography
 What books for children?: Guideposts for Parents – a 363-page handbook first published by Doubleday, Doran & Co in 1937. A revised edition was released in 1941 with additional chapters on radio and comic books.
"Let's Look at the Comics" – An introductory primer published in Child Study (the CSAA's journal) for parents on comic books and common criticisms.
"Looking at the Comics" with Flora Stieglitz Straus – Another Child Study article, this one a breakdown of various types and styles of comic books with evaluation of their appropriateness for children.
 "What's in the Comics?" – a 9-page article published in the December 1944 edition of The Journal of Educational Sociology.
 Your Child's Reading Today – published by Doubleday in 1954.
 Comics, TV, Radio, Movies--what Do They Offer Children? – a 28-page booklet published by the Public Affairs Committee in 1955.
 Television: How to Use it Wisely with Children'' – a 28-page booklet first published by the Child Study Association of America in 1959.

References

1893 births
1989 deaths
American children's writers
American education writers
Jewish American writers
Writers from New York City
20th-century American Jews